Boțești is a commune in Argeș County, Muntenia, Romania. It is composed of two villages: Boțești and Moșteni-Greci.

The commune is right on the 45th parallel north, 45 km northeast of Pitești and 125 km northwest of Bucharest.

Natives
 Ion Diaconescu

References

Communes in Argeș County
Localities in Muntenia